Listen to the City is a 1984 Canadian drama film directed by Ron Mann. Normally a documentary filmmaker, this is Mann's only fictional feature. The film stars P.J. Soles, Jim Carroll, Sandy Horne, and Michael Glassbourg. Featured in small or cameo roles are such notable Canadian counter-culture figures as poets Barrie Phillip Nichol and Barry Callaghan, politician Jack Layton, playwright Sky Gilbert, and radio broadcasters Pete Griffin and Geets Romo.

Plot
Hupar (Jim Carroll) wakes up from a 20-year coma.  Disoriented, he soon meets Arete (Sandy Horne), a young poet, and Sophia (P.J. Soles), a TV newswoman. Together, the three team up to expose corporate crime in a crumbling cityscape of the very near future.

Cast
 P. J. Soles as Sophia
 Michael Glassbourg as Goodman
 Sandy Horne as Arete
 Jim Carroll as Hupar
 Barry Callaghan as Father
 Sky Gilbert as Shadow
 Pete Griffen as Mayor
 Geets Romo as Mayor’s assistant
 Peter Wintonick as Peter
 Bill Lord as Preston Sturrock
 Gigi Guthrie as Christie Hines
 Mary Hawkins as White
 Réal Andrews as Green
 Gary Augustynek as Black
 Jack Layton as patient
 Barrie Phillip Nichol as labour department head

Soundtrack

The Listen to the City soundtrack album consists of the primarily instrumental score for the film, and was written, produced and performed by Gordon Deppe of the band Spoons. On two tracks, Deppe is joined by Sandy Horne as co-performer and co-composer; Horne co-starred in the film and was also a member of Spoons. Rob Preuss, also of Spoons, assists on these two tracks.

The album's final two tracks are actually performed by (and credited to) the Spoons as a whole. These songs, "Tell No Lies" and "Romantic Traffic", were both issued as singles in Canada; both charted and are among the band's most well-known hits in that country.

Track listing

Personnel

Tracks 1-8
 Gordon Deppe — all instruments, except
 Sandy Horne — vocals, bass guitar on 3 and 6
 Rob Preuss — keyboards and rhythm machine on 3 and 6

Production personnel, tracks 1-8
Produced by Gordon Deppe
Engineered by Rick Lightheart and Brian Hewson
Recorded and mixed at Sound Path Studios, Oakville, Ontario

Tracks 9-10
 Gordon Deppe — vocals, guitar
 Sandy Horne — bass, vocals
 Rob Preuss — electronic keyboards and piano
 Derrick Ross — drums

Production personnel, tracks 9-10
 Nile Rodgers — producer
 Jason Corsaro — engineer
 Recorded at the Power Station, New York City

References

External links
 

1984 films
English-language Canadian films
Films shot in Toronto
Films directed by Ron Mann
Canadian drama films
1980s English-language films
1980s Canadian films